Pays-de-Belvès (literally Land of Belvès) is a commune in the Dordogne department of southwestern France. The municipality was established on 1 January 2016 and consists of the former communes of Belvès and Saint-Amand-de-Belvès. Belvès station has rail connections to Périgueux and Agen.

See also 
Communes of the Dordogne department

References 

Communes of Dordogne